John Rich (born 1974) is an American country musician and one-half of the country duo Big and Rich.

John Rich may also refer to:
John Tyler Rich (1841–1926), US Congressman from Michigan
John Rich (director) (1925–2012), American television and film director 
John Rich (producer) (1692–1761), British theater manager and father of English pantomime
John Rich (scholar) (20th century), English professor of Classics
John A. Rich, American professor of medicine and civil servant
John Rich (war correspondent) (1917–2014), war correspondent for NBC News
John Hubbard Rich (1876–1954), American illustrator, painter and art educator